Svetlana Cebotari (born 7 August 1969) is a Moldovan politician. She served as Minister of Health, Labour and Social Protection from 10 January 2018 to 19 September 2018 in the cabinet of Prime Minister Pavel Filip.

References 

Living people
1969 births
Politicians from Chișinău
21st-century Moldovan politicians
Women government ministers of Moldova
21st-century Moldovan women politicians